Cleckheaton is a town and an unparished area in the metropolitan borough of Kirklees, West Yorkshire, England.  Cleckheaton ward contains 31 listed buildings that are recorded in the National Heritage List for England.  Of these, one is listed at Grade II*, the middle of the three grades, and the others are at Grade II, the lowest grade.  In addition to the town of Cleckheaton, the ward contains the smaller settlements of Hightown, Hunsworth, Oakenshaw, and Scholes.  The listed buildings include houses and cottages, farmhouses and farm buildings, churches, chapels and associated structures, public houses, a market cross, a warehouse, a bank, a town hall, a library, a viaduct, a former post office, and a war memorial.


Key

Buildings

References

Citations

Sources

Lists of listed buildings in West Yorkshire
Listed